Sir Baldwin II, Count of Guînes (died 2 January 1205), was a French nobleman.

Biography
Baldwin was a son of Arnoul I, Count de Guînes and Mathilde de Saint-Omer. He succeeded as Count of Guînes from 1169. He received Thomas Becket, Archbishop of Canterbury at Guînes in 1170. Thomas had knighted Baldwin previously.

In 1191, Baldwin II was required to pay homage to the King of France after the ceding of his territory by the Count of Flanders. He also held lands in England.

During a dispute with Renaud I, Count of Dammartin, he was captured whilst fighting. While Baldwin was released a little later, he died of the effects of his captivity.

Marriage and issue
Baldwin married Christine d'Ardres, daughter of Arnould IV de Marcq, vicomte d'Ardres and Adeline d'Ardres, they are known to have had the following issue.
Adeline de Guînes, married firstly Baldwin de Engoudsent and secondly Hugh de Malaunoy, had issue.
Mabille de Guînes, married Jean de Cysoing.
Arnold II de Guînes (died 1220), married Béatrice de Bourbourg, had issue.
Guillaume de Guînes
Manassés de Guînes, married Aiélis  de Tiembronne.
Baudouin de Guînes, priest in Thérouanne.
Gillis de Guînes (died 1227), married firstly Christina de Montgardin, and secondly Adélaïde de Zeltun.
Adeline de Guînes, married Beaudouin de Cayeux
Marguerite de Guînes, married Radboud de Rumes
Mathilde de Guînes, married Guillaume de Thiemnbronne.

Baldwin also is known to have had the following illegitimate children:
Godfrey, Canon to Bruges
Boldekin
Eustache
Willelkin
It is recorded that twenty three illegitimate children attended his funeral.

Citations

References
 
 

1135 births
1205 deaths
12th-century French people
13th-century French people
French soldiers
Lords of France

Place of birth missing